Özge Yağız (born 26 September 1997) is a Turkish actress.

Life and career
Özge Yağız was born on 26 September 1997 in Istanbul. She acquired her education from Başkent University in Communication Sciences Academy. She started her acting career in 2018, with a small role in season 3 of the series Adını Sen Koy and portrayed the character of Zeliha, which was broadcast on Star TV. In February 2019, she appeared in the series Yemin on Kanal 7, and depicted the character of Reyhan, it was her first leading role. Later in 2020, she starred in Sol Yanım and portrayed the character of Serra, which was broadcast on Star TV. It starred Tolga Mendi, Cemre Baysel and Cansel Elçin. 

In 2020, she was transferred to the historical fiction series Kuruluş: Osman and it was decided that she will depict the character of Malhun Hatun, wife of Osman I, however this thought was later dropped and actress Yıldız Çağrı Atiksoy depicted the character of Malhun.

In 2021, she began working on the series İçimizden Biri in which she depicted the character of Havva, daughter of a Turkish Muslim family, who falls in love with Adam, son of an Irish Christian family.

In 2022, she appeared in TV series Baba produced by Ay Yapim.

Filmography

References

External links
 
 

1997 births
Living people
Turkish television actresses
Actresses from Istanbul
Başkent University alumni
21st-century Turkish actresses